HMS Anson is the fifth  nuclear-powered fleet submarine of the Royal Navy. She is the eighth vessel of the Royal Navy to bear the name, after Admiral George Anson.

History
On 25 March 2010, BAE Systems were given the authorisation by the British government to begin construction on boats 5 and 6 (Anson and Agamemnon), being given a £300 million contract for the "initial build" of boat 5 and "long lead procurement activities" for boat 6. Later that year work was begun on the pressure hull and reactor compartments. On 15 September 2011 it was announced that boat 5 would be named Anson; it was previously believed that boat 5 would be Agamemnon and boat 6 Anson. Her keel was ceremonially laid on 13 October 2011. On 19 November 2015, a possible new contract worth £1.3 billion was signed for HMS Anson. She was officially named on 11 December 2020, was rolled out of the Devonshire Dock Hall on 19 April 2021, and launched on 20 April 2021. It completed its first practice dive in a dock on 14 February 2022. She was commissioned on 31 August 2022 prior to starting sea trials.  On 19 February 2023 she left Barrow for the first time for her sea trials.

Design

Propulsion
Ansons nuclear reactor will not need to be refuelled during the boat's 25-year service. Since the submarine can purify water and air, she will be able to circumnavigate the planet without resurfacing. The main limit is that the submarine will only be able to carry three months' supply of food for 98 officers and ratings.

Weapons
Anson  will have provision for up to 38 weapons in six  torpedo tubes.

References

External links
 Royal Navy HMS Anson (royalnavy.mod.uk)

 

Astute-class submarines
Proposed ships of the Royal Navy
Ships built in Barrow-in-Furness
2021 ships